Batrachorhina orientalis is a species of beetle in the family Cerambycidae. It was described by Stephan von Breuning in 1956. It is known from Uganda and Tanzania.

References

Batrachorhina
Beetles described in 1956